Broden is a surname. Notable people with the surname include:

Anita Brodén (born 1948), Swedish politician
Anne Marie Brodén (born 1956), Swedish politician
Connie Broden (1932–2013), Canadian ice hockey player
Elizabeth Broden, Mexican beauty pageant winner
Joakim Brodén (born 1980), Swedish artist
John Broden (born 1965), American politician
Mats Brodén, Swedish artist
Stephen Broden, American politician